Mangelia scabrida is a species of sea snail, a marine gastropod mollusk in the family Mangeliidae.

Description
The length of the shell varies between 3 mm and 11 mm.

Distribution
This species occurs in the Mediterranean Sea and in the North Atlantic Ocean.

References

 Gofas, S.; Le Renard, J.; Bouchet, P. (2001). Mollusca, in: Costello, M.J. et al. (Ed.) (2001). European register of marine species: a check-list of the marine species in Europe and a bibliography of guides to their identification. Collection Patrimoines Naturels, 50: pp. 180–213

External links
  Tucker, J.K. 2004 Catalog of recent and fossil turrids (Mollusca: Gastropoda). Zootaxa 682:1–1295.
 
 Monterosato T. A. (di) (1890). Conchiglie della profondità del mare di Palermo. Naturalista Siciliano, Palermo, 9(6): 140–151

scabrida
Gastropods described in 1890